Sohrai and Khovar painting is a mural art traditionally practiced by women in the Hazaribagh district of Jharkhand. Traditionally used to decorate the hut walls, it is also done on paper and cloth so that it may be sold to patrons.

Sohrai art is done at Sohrai, or harvest festivals. It is done in colour. Khovar painting is done at weddings, in black and white.

History 
The art form was popularized by Bulu Imam, who established the Sanskriti Museum & Art Gallery. In 2018, the Jharkhand government announced plans to adorn trains and government housing with Sohrai paintings. They received the Geographical Indication tag in 2020.

Process 
The walls are first coated with a mixture of soil and dung, and then painted.

References 

Geographical indications in Jharkhand
Murals in India
Culture of Jharkhand
Indian folk art